is a passenger railway station located in the city of Sanuki, Kagawa Prefecture, Japan, operated by Shikoku Railway Company (JR Shikoku). It is numbered "T17".

Lines
Zōda Station is served by the Kōtoku Line, and lies 21.3 km from the starting point of the line at Takamatsu Station.

Station layout
The station consists of two side platforms serving two tracks. The platforms are linked by a footbridge.

Platforms

History
Zōda Station opened on 21 March 1926. With the privatization of Japanese National Railways (JNR) on 1 April 1987, the station came under the control of JR Shikoku.

The station became unstaffed from 1 September 2010.

A new station building was built adjoining the original structure, opening for use on 10 February 2017.

Surrounding area
 Zōda Elementary School

See also
 List of railway stations in Japan

References

External links

 Zoda Station timetable 

Railway stations in Kagawa Prefecture
Stations of Shikoku Railway Company
Railway stations in Japan opened in 1926
Sanuki, Kagawa